St Erney is a hamlet with a Church of England church in Cornwall, England, United Kingdom.

See also

Landrake with St Erney

External links
St Erney, Cornwall; Explore Britain

Hamlets in Cornwall